Kalpnath Paswan is an Indian politician and a member of 11th and 17th Legislative Assembly of Uttar Pradesh of India. He represents the Mehnagar constituency in Azamgarh district of Uttar Pradesh and is a member of the Bhartiya Janta Party.

Political career
Paswan is a member of the 17th Legislative Assembly of Uttar Pradesh. He is a current member of the BJP and in 1991 he represented the Mehnagar constituency.
In 2017 Uttar Pradesh Legislative Elections he defeated Suheldev Bharatiya Samaj Party candidate Manjoo Saroj by a margin of 5,412 votes.

Posts held

See also
Uttar Pradesh Legislative Assembly

References

Uttar Pradesh MLAs 2017–2022
Bharatiya Janata Party politicians from Uttar Pradesh
Living people
1946 births